Sandylay and Moat Woods is a  nature reserve east of Great Leighs in Essex. It is owned and managed by the Essex Wildlife Trust.

These adjacent woods are mainly coppiced small-leaved lime, with a small stream and many flowering plants, including wood anemones, sweet violets, spurge laurel, stinking iris and early purple orchid.

There is access by a footpath from Mill Lane.

References

 Essex Wildlife Trust